Little Flower Forane Church, Nilambur is a Syro-Malabar church situated at Nilambur in Malappuram district.

History
The church, which was established in 1929, is under Manathavady eparchy. The current archbishop of Tellicherry Archdiocese, Mar George Njaralakatt has served as the vicar of the church from 2004 to 2006. Now, Fr. Biju Thuruthel is serving as vicar and Fr. Vinoy Kalappurackal is serving as asst. vicar of the church. There are 489 Catholic families in this church.

Parishes under the church
 Holy Family, Chokkad
 St. Thomas, Edivanna
 Saint Joseph, Moolepadam
 St. Mary, Pookkottumpadam
 Saint George, Poolappadam
 Saint Jude, Rubynagar
 St. Mary, Thelpara
 Saint George, T.K Colony
 St. Mary, Vallikett
Saint Francis of assissi church,vadapuram

External links
Official Website of Mananthavady Diocese

References

Churches in Malappuram district
Syro-Malabar Catholic church buildings
Eastern Catholic churches in Kerala
Churches completed in 1929